This is a list of local authorities in London, England, from 1855 to 1900. There were some changes to their number between 1886 and 1894. Following the changes there were 42 authorities responsible for local government, made up of 29 administrative vestries, 12 district boards and one local board of health.

Administrative vestries and district boards
The following were the local authorities incorporated by the Metropolis Management Act 1855. They functioned from 1855 to 1900, unless otherwise stated. The administrative vestries were delineated as the Schedule A vestries in the Metropolis Management Act 1855. The district boards and administrative vestries had identical powers, but different methods of election. The administrative vestries were directly elected and the district boards were appointed by non-administrative vestries. The equivalent body for the City of London at this time was the Commissioners of Sewers.

1855 incorporations

Later incorporations
The following became administrative vestries or district boards as shown.

Non-administrative vestries
The following were non-administrative vestries. They had very limited functions, with their main purpose to appoint members to the district boards of works. They were delineated as the Schedule B vestries in the Metropolis Management Act 1855 and were also known as the smaller vestries. There were 55 non-administrative vestries in 1855 and their number had reduced to 47 in 1894 as some had been upgraded to administrate vestries.

References

History of local government in London (1855–1889)